José Manuel Sempere Maciá (born 15 February 1958) is a Spanish retired footballer who played as a goalkeeper.

Club career
Born in Torrellano, Province of Alicante, Valencian Community, Sempere finished his youth career with local giants Valencia CF, making his senior debut with RCD Español on loan (no official appearances). Returned to the Che in the summer of 1980, one of his first games was the season's UEFA Super Cup second leg, with the side winning the competition against Nottingham Forest and him being the youngest ever goalkeeper to win that tournament, a record broken 22 years later by Iker Casillas of Real Madrid.

For 14 of his 15 seasons with his main club, Sempere alternated between first and second-choice, battling for starting duties with the likes of José Ramón Bermell and José Manuel Ochotorena. From 1991 to 1994 he collected a further La Liga 104 appearances as his team finished twice in the top four, but was again relegated to the bench for the 1994–95 campaign following the arrival of Andoni Zubizarreta from FC Barcelona, retiring in June 1995 at the age of 37.

International career
Sempere was part of Spain's squad at the 1977 FIFA World Youth Championship, but played no games in Tunisia.

Honours
Valencia
UEFA Super Cup: 1980
Segunda División: 1986–87

References

External links

CiberChe biography and stats 

1958 births
Living people
Spanish footballers
Footballers from Elche
Association football goalkeepers
La Liga players
Segunda División players
Tercera División players
Valencia CF Mestalla footballers
Valencia CF players
RCD Espanyol footballers
Spain under-23 international footballers
Spain B international footballers